The 2015 interim election government of Turkey was a temporary election government formed by Prime Minister Ahmet Davutoğlu on the request of President Recep Tayyip Erdoğan. It is also referred to as the Second Davutoğlu Cabinet. As the 63rd government of Turkey, the cabinet presided over the November 2015 general election and dissolved after a new government is formed after the election. It is the first such government to take office in the history of the Turkish Republic.

After the Justice and Development Party (AKP) won back its majority in the November election, the interim election government formally dissolved on 24 November 2015 and was succeeded by AKP leader Ahmet Davutoğlu's third government.

Background
The June 2015 general election resulted in a hung parliament, with the Justice and Development Party (AKP) falling 18 seats short of a majority. President Recep Tayyip Erdoğan invited AKP leader Ahmet Davutoğlu to form a government, by virtue of leading the largest party in the Grand National Assembly. After a series of unsuccessful coalition negotiations with the main opposition Republican People's Party (CHP) and the Nationalist Movement Party (MHP), Davutoğlu returned the mandate to the President five days before the 45-day allowance to form a government ended, after which Erdoğan controversially refused to invite the CHP leader Kemal Kılıçdaroğlu to form a government and instead announced his intention to call a snap general election. Amid rumours that Erdoğan had always favoured going into an early election rather than allowing his former party (the AKP) to form a coalition government, his decision to call an election was finalised on 24 August 2015 and the Supreme Electoral Council of Turkey (YSK) announced 1 November as the date for the new vote.

Constitutional provision
As enshrined in the Constitution of Turkey, an interim cabinet formed together by all the parties in Parliament must be formed in the event that the President calls for a new vote. The number of ministries given to each party is determined by how many MPs they have in Parliament. The Speaker of the Grand National Assembly, İsmet Yılmaz, determined that the AKP would be given 11 ministries, the CHP 5, the MHP 3 and the Peoples' Democratic Party (HDP) also 3. The Ministry of Transport, Maritime and Communication, Ministry of Justice and the Ministry of the Interior would be overseen by independent ministers, as is also the case for any government going into an election. Parties who do not wish to take part in the government can opt out, in which case the individual tasked with forming the government (in this case Davutoğlu) must offer their ministries to independents. The CHP and MHP announced that they would not take part in the government.

Formation process
Davutoğlu was tasked with forming the interim cabinet on 25 August 2015, after which he sent out letters to members of different parties offering them a ministerial position in the new government on 26 August 2015. He has five days to form a government. Amid claims that the AKP was uncomfortable with going into government along with politicians from the HDP, Davutoğlu made offers to CHP and MHP politicians despite their party leaders announcing that they would not take part. It was also rumoured that Davutoğlu could offer ministerial positions to independents who were seen as close or formerly a member of the CHP and MHP to weaken the perception that the interim government was just an AKP-HDP coalition. In a last-ditch attempt to keep the HDP out of government, Davutoğlu proposed a triple coalition government between the AKP, CHP and MHP until an election took place. The offer was rejected by both the CHP and MHP.

Ministerial appointments

Initial invitations
The following tables show the politicians from all four parties represented in Parliament that were invited to become ministers in the interim cabinet.

MHP MP Tuğrul Türkeş caused an uproar within his party after accepting Davutoğlu's invitation to become a minister, despite his party's staunch refusal to take part. The MHP issued a statement demanding that he resign from the party and that he would be suspended if he didn't do so. The MHP later began disciplinary proceedings to suspend Türkeş from the party, while Davutoğlu praised him for showing true statesmanship. He was formally suspended from the MHP on 5 September 2015, with the MHP subsequently falling behind the HDP and becoming the fourth largest party in Parliament with 79 seats.

HDP MP Levent Tüzel rejected a ministerial position despite his party's approval of its MPs to participate. The reason was due to opposition by the Labour Party (EMEP) to Tüzel's involvement. Tüzel had founded the EMEP in 1996 and led it until 2011, with the party supporting the HDP in the June 2015 general election.

With 8 politicians declining ministerial positions and the Ministries of Transport, Interior and Justice being reserved for non-partisan independents, the cabinet will consist of 12 independent ministers.

Composition

Controversies

Pro-AKP Independents
With 11 independents due to be appointed, it was observed that many independents were in fact former AKP politicians or individuals with close ties with the AKP. These included the following ministers.

It was revealed that Ali Rıza Alaboyun, Kutbettin Arzu and Vecdi Gönül all resigned from the AKP shortly before the cabinet was formed so that they could take part as an Independent. Cenap Aşçı was a civil servant with no political affiliation before his appointment, despite trying unsuccessfully to become an AKP parliamentary candidate.

References

2015 in Turkey
Cabinets of Turkey
Cabinets established in 2015
2015 establishments in Turkey
Members of the 63rd government of Turkey
Cabinets disestablished in 2015